Wadestown may also refer to:

 Wadestown, West Virginia, an unincorporated community in the United States
 Wadestown, New Zealand, a suburb in Wellington, New Zealand